All-Star Superman is a 2011 American animated superhero film based on the comic book series of the same name by Grant Morrison and Frank Quitely. Released direct-to-video by Warner Bros. Animation on February 22, 2011, it is the tenth film of the DC Universe Animated Original Movies.

It is the first film in the series to not receive a PG-13 rating from the Motion Picture Association, instead being rated PG for “sequences of action and violence, language including brief innuendo, and some sensuality”. It is also one of the final projects by writer Dwayne McDuffie and was released the day after his death.

Plot
Dr. Leo Quintum and his team are exploring the Sun when they are sabotaged by a booby-trapped genetically-enhanced time-bomb clone made by Lex Luthor. Superman stops the clone but in doing so receives an overdose of solar radiation; it has given him increased powers, but at the cost of slowly killing him. Luthor is arrested thanks to Clark Kent's article and sentenced to death.

Wanting to spend as much of his remaining time as possible with Lois Lane, Superman reveals to her that he is Clark Kent, and takes her to the Fortress of Solitude. During this visit, Superman's secretive behavior and her indirect exposure to alien chemicals heightens Lois' paranoia. Superman is able to calm her, explaining his caginess was to hide her birthday present, a serum granting her superpowers for 24 hours. Now as a Superwoman, she and Superman stop an attack by Subterranosauri led by Krull in Metropolis just as Samson (who tricked Krull into leading an attack on the surface world) and Atlas arrive. After the Subterranosauri are returned to the center of the Earth, Samson flirts with Lois and gives her a necklace, the crown jewels of the Ultra-Sphinx. When Superman tells him to back off, he challenges Superman to contests to win Lois. After the contests, Superman finally defeats Atlas and Samson in a double arm-wrestling match before spending the rest of the day with Lois as her powers fade.

Later, Clark tells Lois he's dying, before leaving to take the city of Kandor to a new planet to thrive, despite it being permanently shrunk, as he does not believe he'll survive the trip back. Clark leaves with Lois promising to wait for his return.

Two months later, Superman returns to find Metropolis has been repaired with Kryptonian architecture and that Earth has been protected by Bar-El and Lilo, lost astronauts from Krypton. They followed the trail of the vessel that brought Superman to Earth. To his dismay, the two have less altruistic goals and intend to turn Earth into a new Krypton. As they fight Superman outside of the Daily Planet, Bar-El and Lilo begin showing signs of illness: the two had passed through the remnants of Krypton and thus were saturated with Kryptonite. To save them and at their request, Superman places the two in the Phantom Zone until a cure can be found.

Unbeknownst to anyone, Luthor reprogrammed one of the Fortress' robots to steal the serum Superman made for Lois' birthday. Having the powers of Superman, Luthor's death by electric chair failed and he escapes unfettered.

Superman learns that Luthor's secret ally Solaris; the tyrant star computer has betrayed Luthor by tampering with Earth's sun and turned it blue. With his robots, Superman engages Solaris in space. However, all seems lost until Superman's pet Sun-Eater sacrifices itself to weaken the tyrant star, which allows Superman to destroy Solaris.

Clark returns to the Daily Planet, very ill, and collapses upon completing his article, "SUPERMAN DEAD". When the staff tries to save him they realize that he has stopped breathing and his heart has stopped. But before they can do anything to help Clark, the super-powered Lex Luthor arrives and attempts to kill Lois. Clark revives and fires a gravity gun at Luthor. As his powers fade, Luthor briefly sees the world as Superman sees it and weeps as he gains a measure of understanding of the subatomic and how it interconnects. Luthor wishes the experience to continue, but when he reaches for his next vial of serum, he realizes that Superman has stolen his supply. Superman then destroys the serum over Luthor's protests, pointing out that if Luthor truly cared about solving the world's problems, he would have done so long ago. Luthor somberly admits Superman is right.

With Superman's body starting to turn into pure energy, he and Lois embrace one final time and, he proclaims his love for her once-and-for all. He gives her his cape as a way to remember him before he leaves and flies into the sun (seemingly) sacrificing himself to save the Earth.

Later, Jimmy invites Lois to attend a memorial service being held for Superman. Lois does not go as she believes that Superman is not dead and will return after he repairs the sun. Quintum visits Luthor in his cell. Now enlightened from his ordeal and accepting his impending death, Luthor presents Quintum with the only thing that could redeem him for his actions over the years, a formula to recreate Superman's genetic structure through a healthy human ovum. The movie ends with a picture of Superman fixing the sun and Lois' voice once more stating "he's not dead, he's up there fixing the sun and when he's done, he'll be back".

Cast
 James Denton as Kal-El / Clark Kent / Superman
 Christina Hendricks as Lois Lane / Superwoman
 Anthony LaPaglia as Lex Luthor
 Edward Asner as Perry White
 Frances Conroy as Martha Kent
 Linda Cardellini as Nasthalthia
 Cathy Cavadini as Floral, Cat Grant
 Steve Blum as Atlas, General Sam Lane
 Obba Babatundé as Judge, Bibliobot
 Chris Cox as Lead Agent
 Alexis Denisof as Dr. Leo Quintum
 John DiMaggio as Samson, Ultra-Sphinx
 Robin Atkin Downes as Solaris
 Michael Gough as Parasite
 Matthew Gray Gubler as Jimmy Olsen
 Finola Hughes as Lilo
 Kevin Michael Richardson as Steve Lombard, Tyrannko
 Fred Tatasciore as Krull
 Arnold Vosloo as Bar-El

Reception
IGN gave the Blu-ray release a score of 7 out of 10, praising the visuals but stating that "there are too many threads, too many characters and too many detours down paths that don't amount to much in the end." ComicsAlliance criticized some of the changes made in the adaptation, specifically those which involve Superman killing or allowing others to die, but concluded by calling the film "a highly enjoyable picture, and one of DC's best offerings.

The film earned $4,701,620 from domestic DVD sales and $2,474,410 from domestic Blu-ray sales, bringing its total domestic home video earnings to $7,176,030.

Home media
The film comes in both DVD and Blu-ray and includes two bonus episodes from Superman: The Animated Series (Blasts From the Past, Part 1, Blasts From the Past, Part 2) selected by Bruce Timm and a preview of the next DC Universe Animated Original Movie, Green Lantern: Emerald Knights.

References

External links

 
 Official DC Comics Site
 .
 All-Star Superman at The World's Finest
 

2011 animated films
2011 films
2010s animated superhero films
Animated Superman films
DC Universe Animated Original Movies
2011 direct-to-video films
2010s American animated films
2010s direct-to-video animated superhero films
Films directed by Sam Liu
Warner Bros. Animation animated films
Warner Bros. direct-to-video animated films
American animated science fiction films
Animated films about extraterrestrial life
2011 science fiction films
2010s English-language films